Oliver Twist is a 1982 American-British made-for-television film adaptation of the 1838 Charles Dickens classic of the same name, premiering on the CBS television network as part of the Hallmark Hall of Fame.  Stars include George C. Scott, Tim Curry, Cherie Lunghi, and Richard Charles as Oliver, in his first major film role.

Plot
A young woman dies in childbirth. Witnessing the woman's birth is Mr. Bumble, a hard-nosed man in charge of the local orphans workhouse. With no information on the mother's identity, he gives the boy the name Oliver Twist.

Like the other boys in the workhouse, Oliver lives a hard life of endless labour and schooling, with only a bowl of gruel for supper.  After seeing his friend Dick devour his bowl and still wanting more, Oliver offers the lad his own, then goes up to Bumble and asks for more.  His request angers Bumble, who hires him out to work for Mr Sowerberry, a local undertaker. 

Oliver's situation is not much different than the workhouse, as he is given a workbench to sleep on and scraps that Sowerberry's dogs refuse to eat for food. Oliver also becomes an object of hatred for Noah Claypole, a teenager been assigned to supervise him. Claypole taunts Oliver one day, making fun of his dead mother. The insulting remark angers Oliver, who delivers a surprisingly powerful blow to Claypole's face, breaking his nose. Sowerberry takes Claypole's side and tells Oliver he will be returned to the workhouse the following day. Unwilling to return to the workhouse, Oliver sneaks out later that evening . He roams the streets until he  is met by the Artful Dodger, who offers Oliver lodgings from his benefactor. Oliver agrees, unaware of what he has got himself into.

Oliver is now part of a band of thieves, overseen by Fagin, a kindly Jewish man. Among Fagin's group are Bill Sikes, a drunk who oversees the orphan thieves, and Nancy, an attractive young woman often used for sexual favors, and frequently abused by Bill. She takes a liking to Oliver and tries to help him, but for this, she is eventually viciously murdered by Bill.

Oliver is made aware of his true purpose with Fagin when Sikes forces Oliver to help him burglarize a home in the countryside.  The boy is shot in the process.  An elderly man, Mr Brownlow, along with his niece Rose Maylie and housekeeper, Mrs. Bedwin, take pity upon him and nurse the boy back to health. They notice a close resemblance between Oliver and a lady's portrait on the wall.

Monks, another criminal associate of Fagin's, has learned that he and Oliver are half-brothers and that their father has disinherited him in favor of Oliver. Brownlow is revealed to be a friend of Oliver's father, who left both the will and a portrait he had painted of Oliver's mother with Brownlow. Brownlow does some investigative work on his own to bring justice to his friend's young son. He learns of the cruelty and inhumane conditions at the workhouse, and also learns of Bumble's theft of workhouse funds for his own benefit. After receiving a locket Mrs. Bumble had stolen from Agnes's corpse and revealing to everyone the boy's true identity, Brownlow tells Monks that he will be going to prison. Brownlow tells Bumble that he will use his influence to see to it that he and his wife lose their workhouse jobs and may even face criminal charges.

Monks is sent to prison whilst Brownlow and Rose assure Oliver that he is no longer a foundling, but now has an identity of his own. Everyone then climbs into Brownlow's coach and they make the journey back to Brownlow's estate.

Cast

References

External links
 
 
 
harsh critic in the NY Times

1982 television films
1982 films
Films shot at EMI-Elstree Studios
1980s English-language films
American television films
British television films
Television shows based on Oliver Twist
CBS network films
Films based on Oliver Twist
Films directed by Clive Donner